The National and University Library (abbreviated BNU) is a public library in Strasbourg, France. It is located on Place de la République, the former Kaiserplatz, and faces the Palais du Rhin.

History 
After the destruction of the municipal library and the city's archives by Prussian artillery during the Siege of Strasbourg, the German Empire founded the BNU on 19 June 1872. The task of arranging its collections was given to historian and professor, Rodolphe Reuss.

It became the regional library for the Reichsland Alsace-Lorraine, as, according to German tradition, every region should have at least one library. It was also an Academic library.

The collections grew quickly, thanks principally to donations from all across Europe and the United States. But, even in spite of these generous donations, many priceless manuscripts, such as the Hortus Deliciarum had been destroyed and could never be replaced.

The present-day building, which is a work of architects August Hartel and Skjold Neckelmann, was opened in 1895.

After the territory of Alsace-Lorraine had been reverted to France following World War I, the question arose as to whether or not this library should be renovated and reopened. After some hesitation, the French government decided to keep the library.

The library now holds about 3,000,000 volumes, which is the second largest collection in France. The collection contains, amongst other things, ca. 2,300 incunabula, 6,700 manuscripts (plus 29,000 others from the archives – kept by the library – of the De Turckheim family, and several other thousands from the Alsatian Franciscan order) and 5,200 papyri.

References

External links 

 Official Website

Library buildings completed in 1895
Libraries in France
University of Strasbourg
Organizations based in Strasbourg
Tourist attractions in Strasbourg
Monuments historiques of Strasbourg
1895 establishments in France
Libraries established in 1872
19th-century architecture in France